Sarighiol may refer to several places:
 Albești village, Constanța County, Romania
 Valea Nucarilor village, Tulcea County, Romania
 Sarighiol de Deal, a village in Beidaud Commune, Tulcea County, Romania
 Tarnovtsi, Tutrakan Municipality, Bulgaria